History of the Tartars or Historia Tartarorum may refer to:

the Tartar Relation of C. de Bridia (1247)
the Historia Tartarorum of Simon of Saint-Quentin (before 1253)
the Tatar sections of the Flor des estoires de la terre d'Orient of Hayton of Corycus (1307)